William Lily (or William Lilly or Lilye; c. 146825 February 1522) was an English classical grammarian and scholar.  He was an author of the most widely used Latin grammar textbook in England and was the first high master of St Paul's School, London.

Life
Lily was born in c. 1468 at Odiham, Hampshire and he entered the University of Oxford in 1486.  After graduating in arts he went on a pilgrimage to Jerusalem.  On his return journey he put in at Rhodes, which was still occupied by the knights of St John, under whose protection many Greeks had taken refuge after the capture of Constantinople by the Turks. He then went on to Italy, where he attended the lectures of Angelus Sabinus, Sulpitius Verulanus and Pomponius Laetus at Rome, and of Egnatius at Venice.

After his return he settled in London—where he became friends with Thomas More—as a private teacher of grammar, and is believed to have been the first who taught Greek in that city. In 1510 John Colet, dean of St Paul's, who was then founding the school which afterwards became famous, appointed Lily the first high master in 1512. Colet's correspondence with Erasmus shows he first offered the position to the Dutchman, who refused it, before considering Lily.  Ward and Waller ranked Lily "with Grocyn and Linacre as one of the most erudite students of Greek that England possessed". Lily's pupils included William Paget, John Leland, Antony Denny, Thomas Wriothesley and Edward North, 1st Baron North. The school became a paragon of classical scholarship.

He died of the plague in London on 25 February 1522 and was buried in the north churchyard of Old St Paul's Cathedral. His grave and monument were destroyed in the Great Fire of London in 1666. A modern monument in the crypt lists his as one of the important graves lost.

Works
Lily is famous not only as one of the pioneers of Greek learning, but as one of the joint-authors of a book, familiar to many generations of students up to the 19th century, the old Eton Latin grammar or Accidence.  This Brevissima Institutio, a sketch by Colet, corrected by Erasmus and worked upon by Lily, contains two portions the author of which is indisputably Lily.  These are the lines on the genders of nouns, beginning Propria quae maribus, and those on the conjugation of verbs beginning As in praesenti.  The Carmen de Moribus bears Lily's name in the early editions; but Thomas Hearne asserts that it was written by Leland, who was one of his scholars, and that Lily only adapted it. However Erasmus himself stated:

At Colet's command, this book was written by William Lily, a man of no ordinary skill, a wonderful craftsman in the instruction of boys. When he had completed his work, it was handed over to, nay rather thrust upon, me for emendation. easier for me to do). So that Lily (endowed as he is with too much modesty) did not permit the book to appear with his name, and I (with my sense of candour) did not feel justified that the book should bear my name when it was the work of another. Since both of us refused our names it was published anonymously, Colet merely commending it in a preface.

An edition published in 1534 was entitled Rudimenta Grammatices. Various other parts were added and a stable form finally appeared in 1540. In 1542 Henry VIII authorised it as the sole Latin grammar textbook to be used in education and schools; it has been suggested that Henry commissioned the book but the interval between initial publication and authorisation argue against this. With corrections and revisions, it was used for more than three hundred years. It was so widely used by Elizabethan scholars that Shakespeare was able to refer to it in the second scene of Act IV of Titus Andronicus, quote from it in the first scene of Act II of Henry IV, Part 1 ("Homo is a common name to all men") and allude to it in the first scene of Act IV of The Merry Wives of Windsor and scene 1 of Act IV of Much Ado about Nothing.

Part of the grammar is a poem, "Carmen de Moribus", which lists school regulations in a series of pithy sentences, using a broad vocabulary, and examples of most of the rules of Latin grammar that were part of an English grammar school curriculum.  (See Latin mnemonics.) The poem is an early reinforcement of part of the reading list in Erasmus' De Ratione Studii of the Classical authors who should be included in the curriculum of a Latin grammar school.  Specifically, the authors derived from Erasmus are Cicero, Terence, and Virgil.

When John Milton wrote his Latin grammar Accedence Commenc't Grammar (1669), over 60 percent of his 530 illustrative quotations were taken from Lily's grammar.

Besides the Brevissima Institutio, Lily wrote a variety of Latin pieces and translations from Greek, both in prose and verse.  Some of the latter are printed along with the Latin verses of Sir Thomas More in Progymnasmata Thomae Mori et Gulielmi Lylii Sodalium (1518). Another volume of Latin verse (Antibossicon ad Gulielmum Hormannum, 1521) is directed against a rival schoolmaster and grammarian, Robert Whittington, who had "under the feigned name of Bossus, much provoked Lily with scoffs and biting verses."

A sketch of Lily's life by his son George Lily was written for Paulus Jovius, who was collecting for his history the lives of the learned men of Great Britain.

Notes

Sources
 Anders, Henry R. D., Shakespeare's books: A dissertation on Shakespeare's reading and the immediate sources of his works (New York: AMS, 1965)
 
 
 Hedwig Gwosdek [Ed.]: Lily's grammar of Latin in English : an introduction of the eyght partes of speche, and the construction of the same, Oxford : Oxford Univ. Press, 2013, 
 Joseph Hirst Lupton, formerly sur-master of St Paul's School, in the Dictionary of National Biography.
 Ward, A. W. and Waller, A.R. (eds.) The Cambridge History of English and American Literature. Volume III: Renascence and Reformation (Cambridge: University Press, 1908)

External links
 Archival Material at  

1460s births
1522 deaths
16th-century Latin-language writers
16th-century deaths from plague (disease)
16th-century English educators
High Masters of St Paul's School
Infectious disease deaths in England
People from Odiham
Grammarians of Latin
Schoolteachers from Hampshire